The Gore Hill Freeway is a  divided freeway located in Sydney, New South Wales that is part of the Sydney Orbital Network and the Highway 1.

History

Construction of the freeway commenced in August 1988 as part of the Bicentennial Roads Program and opened to traffic on 26 August 1992.

Route
In the north-west, the freeway terminus is at the interchange with the Pacific Highway, the Lane Cove Tunnel and Longueville Road at Lane Cove. On signs the Gore Hill Freeway is signed only as Freeway.

Forming part of the Sydney Orbital Network, the freeway provides access to most of the suburbs in Sydney; it is also a major route to the north, south, east and west of the metropolis.

Sound walls were pioneered as both art and architecture incorporating abstract road motifs in bas relief concrete and historical designs by Walter Burley Griffin. The language reinterprets local aboriginal rock engravings chipped into the ribbed retaining walls.

Exits and interchanges
The entire road is in the City of Willoughby local government area.

See also

 Freeways in Australia
 Freeways in Sydney

References

External links

Streets in Sydney
Highway 1 (Australia)
Gore Hill, New South Wales
Artarmon, New South Wales